The Shaolin School is a fictional martial arts school mentioned in several works of wuxia fiction. It is one of the largest and best-known orthodox schools in the wulin (martial artists' community). Its base is in Shaolin Monastery, Henan, China. It is also sometimes referred to as "Shaolin Monastery" or "Shaolin Temple" instead of "Shaolin School".

Apart from playing the role of a leading righteous school in the wulin in wuxia novels, Shaolin is also featured in popular culture and martial arts films such as The 36th Chamber of Shaolin (1978), Shaolin Temple (1982), and Shaolin (2011). It is also synonymous with Chinese martial arts as it is mentioned in wuxia stories as the origin of all Chinese martial arts. It is best known worldwide for the Shaolin Kung Fu associated with the monastery.

The school's members are predominantly Buddhist monks with a minority of non-monks known as "secular members". Apart from training in martial arts, the monks also follow Buddhist customs, and practices.

History
The Shaolin School was founded during the Five Dynasties and Ten Kingdoms period by the Buddhist monk Bodhidharma, who wanted his followers to practice martial arts for improving health, and self-defense, as well as upholding justice and helping the weak. Shaolin members are expected to follow a Buddhist code of conduct in addition to having a good mastery of martial arts.

Organisation
The school is led by the abbot of the monastery. Shaolin members are ranked by generation. Each member of a certain generation has a prefix before his Buddhist name to indicate his position in the hierarchy. In Demi-Gods and Semi-Devils, the most senior generation is the Xuán generation. The abbot is Xuanci and the senior monks such as Xuanji, Xuannan, Xuandu, and Xuanku also have a Xuán prefix in their names. One of the novel's three protagonists, Xuzhu, is from the Xū generation, which is two generations after the Xuán generation.

In The Legend of the Condor Heroes, the Xianxia School is a branch of Shaolin. Its base is at Yunxi Monastery in southern China. Its members include Reverend Jiaomu, Reverend Kumu, and Kumu's apprentice, Lu Guanying.

The following is a list of generation ranks in different eras:
 Song dynasty: Líng, Xuán, Huì, Xū, Kōng
 Yuan dynasty: Dù, Kōng, Yuán, Huì, Fǎ, Xiàng, Zhuāng
 Qing dynasty: Dà, Jué, Guān, Huì, Chéng, Jìng, Yán, Huá

The school is subdivided into several groups, which take charge of different parts of the monastery or different aspects of the school's daily activities. They include:
 Abbot's Vihāra, the abbot's quarters.
 Bodhidharma Hall, the martial arts training grounds for only Shaolin martial arts.
 Arhat Hall, the meeting grounds with challengers from other schools.
 Prajñā Hall, another martial arts training grounds, where other school's martial arts are also practised.
 Discipline Hall, the group in charge of maintaining law and order in the school.
 Bodhi Hall, the place where the Yijin Jing is kept.
 Bhaishajyaraja Hall, the hospital wing where the sick and injured are attended to.
 Śarīra Hall, the crematorium for cremating deceased members.
 Guest Hall, the reception grounds for guests.
 Library, the place where Buddhist scriptures and martial arts manuals are kept.

Martial arts
The Shaolin School is hailed as the origin of all Chinese martial arts and as a leading orthodox school in the wulin (martial artists' community). In Demi-Gods and Semi-Devils, it is said to house 72 powerful forms of martial arts and no one has managed to master all of them since the founding of the school. These martial arts have Buddhist names, such as "Bodhidharma's Palm" and "Arhat's Fist".

It is also home to the Yijin Jing, a manual instructing the user how to master a certain technique that improves the user's prowess in all types of martial arts. It has also powerful healing properties if the user manages to master the skill. In Demi-Gods and Semi-Devils, You Tanzhi acquires the manual by chance and uses its skills to purge poison in his body after he is bitten by venomous creatures. The sutra also increases his inner energy and stamina, allowing him to deliver an ordinary palm stroke with force several times the original impact. In The Smiling, Proud Wanderer, Linghu Chong uses the skills in the manual to heal his internal wounds.

 Note: Although the skills listed here are entirely fictional, some are based on or named after actual martial arts.

 Foundation skills:
 Shaolin Long Fist
 Arhat's Fist
 Tiger Subduing Palm
 Skanda's Palm
 Merciful Thousand Leaves Hand
 Fist styles:
 Dashing Shaolin
 Drunken Fist
 Five Elements Linked Fist
 Lu Zhishen Pounds the Door Drunken Fist
 Heaven and Earth in the Sleeve
 Great Vajra Fist

 Palm styles:
 Great Skanda's Palm
 Evil Subduing Palm
 Divine Vajra Palm
 Vajra Prajñā Palm
 Prajñā Palm
 Eight Styles of Divine Palm
 Thousand Hands Buddha's Palm
 Mount Meru Palm
 Flower Scattering Palm
 Snowy Mountain Palm
 Bodhidharma's Palm
 Swift Palm
 Rock Wielding Palm
 One Clap Two Scatters

 Finger styles:
 Indian Buddha's Finger
 Maha Finger
 Pattra Finger
 Animitta Kalpa Finger
 Flower Pinching Finger
 Great Strength Vajra Finger
 Great Wisdom Samadhi Finger
 One Finger Zen
 Battle formations:
 Great Arhat Formation
 Vajra Evil Subduing Ring
 Arhat's Sword Formation

 Sword styles:
 Arhat's Swordplay
 Skanda's Evil Subduing Swordplay
 Bodhidharma Swordplay
 Saber styles:
 Evil Subduing Saber Style
 Burning Wood Saber Style
 Staff styles:
 Evil Subduing Staff Style
 Evil Suppressing Staff Style
 Wild Demon's Staff Style
 Small Yaksha's Staff Style
 Big Yaksha's Staff Style
 Obtaining the Scriptures Staff Style

 Inner energy skills:
 Vajra Evil Subduing Divine Skill
 Vajra Body Defending Divine Skill
 Yijin Jing
 Nine Yang Divine Skill
 Arhat Evil Subduing Divine Skill
 Plain Clothing Skill
 Kasaya Evil Subduing Skill
 Others:
 Golden Bell Shield
 Iron Shirt
 Pārami Hand
 Vajra Zen Lion's Roar
 Shadowless Formless Legs
 Great Skanda's Mace

 Grappling styles:
 Dragon Capturing Hand
 Great Strength Vajra Grab
 Eagle's Claw
 Nirvana Grab
 Indra's Grab
 Tiger Claw
 Dragon Claw
 Grabbing Hand
 Big Grabbing Hand
 Small Grabbing Hand
 Flower Pinching Grabbing Hand
 Shaolin Eighteen Styles Grabbing Hand

Discontinued use of the name "Shaolin" in television series
The term "Shaolin School" was not used in two television series adapted from Jin Yong's wuxia novels. In The Heaven Sword and Dragon Saber (2009), an adaptation of the novel of the same title, the Shaolin School is referred to as the Monks' School. In Swordsman (2013), an adaptation of The Smiling, Proud Wanderer, Shaolin Monastery is referred to as Lingjiu Monastery.

Although some viewers have expressed dissatisfaction over the changes, the reasons behind the renaming are not made clear to the public. Some people believe that the producers wanted to avoid trademark infringement, since Shaolin Monastery has officially registered "Shaolin" as a trademark and has been involved in lawsuits with commercial companies over the use of "Shaolin" as a brand name or trademark.

In the 2019 television series Heavenly Sword and Dragon Slaying Sabre, the Shaolin School is referred to by its proper name again.

See also
 Shaolin Kung Fu
 Shaolin Monastery
 Southern Shaolin Monastery

Notes

Organizations in Wuxia fiction
Shaolin Temple